A list of windmills in Lot-et-Garonne, France.

External links
French windmills website

Windmills in France
Lot-et-Garonne
Buildings and structures in Lot-et-Garonne